Utricularia nelumbifolia is a large perennial aquatic carnivorous plant that belongs to the genus Utricularia. U. nelumbifolia is endemic to Brazil. It was originally published and described by George Gardner in 1842. U. nelumbifolia will produce aerial stolons that descend into nearby leaf axils in order to colonize new territory, similar to the habit of U. humboldtii. It typically flowers from May to August.

See also 
 List of Utricularia species

References 

Carnivorous plants of South America
Flora of Brazil
nelumbifolia
Epiphytes